Antoni Jelen (born 13 June 1964 in Poland) is a Polish retired footballer.

References

Polish footballers
1964 births
Living people
Association football midfielders
Dynamo Dresden players
FC Sachsen Leipzig players
1. FC Union Berlin players
Bischofswerdaer FV 08 players
Polish expatriate footballers
Expatriate footballers in Germany
Polish expatriate sportspeople in Germany